Traverser may refer to:
 Traverser (band), an American progressive/alternative band
 Transfer table, in railway terminology
 Container crane, in marine/shipping terminology